The name Windesheim may refer to:
 Windesheim, Netherlands, a place in the Netherlands, near Zwolle
the Christelijke Hogeschool Windesheim, an institution of higher education there
the Augustianian abbey there, which gave its name to the Congregation of Windesheim
Windesheim, Germany, a place in Rhineland-Palatinate, Germany